Zhang Hongpeng (15 July 1987, Anda, China) is a Chinese sprint canoeist.  At the 2012 Summer Olympics, he competed in the Men's K-4 1000 metres, finishing in 8th place with the team in the semifinal.

References

Chinese male canoeists
Living people
Olympic canoeists of China
Canoeists at the 2012 Summer Olympics
Canoeists at the 2014 Asian Games
1987 births
People from Anda
Asian Games competitors for China